The discography of the Northern Irish DJ and electronic music artist Fergie consists of 1 studio album, 11 DJ mixes, 7 extended plays, 37 singles and 32 remixes. He has recorded 13 Essential Mixes which were broadcast on BBC Radio 1. His DJ mixes have been released by record labels such as Sony Music, Ministry of Sound and Virgin Records. 2 of his DJ mixes have been released as covermount CDs for Mixmag magazine. In the studio, in addition to his solo work, he has collaborated on original tracks with artists including Mauro Picotto, BK, Agnelli & Nelson and Alan Fitzpatrick. He has remixed a diverse range of artists and groups including Pet Shop Boys, Tears for Fears, Unkle, Slam, Umek, Joseph Capriati.

Albums

Studio albums

DJ mixes compilations

Released commercially

Released as magazine covermounts

Extended plays

Singles

As lead artist

As featured artist

Released exclusively on compilation albums

Remixes 

*a character in the Pet Shop Boys & Jonathan Harvey musical Closer To Heaven, played by Paul Keating.

BBC Radio 1 Essential Mixes

References

Discographies of British artists
Electronic music discographies